Gymnanthes is a genus of flowering plants in the spurge family, Euphorbiaceae first described as a genus in 1788. It is found primarily in the warmer parts of the Western Hemisphere (from Florida and Mexico south to Argentina), but with some species in central Africa and southwestern Southeast Asia.

Members of the genus are commonly known as oysterwood. The genus has 45 species and is pantropical.

Species

Species
moved to other genera: Actinostemon Ditrysinia Microstachys Sebastiania Stillingia

References

Hippomaneae
Euphorbiaceae genera
Pantropical flora
Taxa named by Olof Swartz